Abdul-Hamid Musa Kasha is a Sudanese politician who is currently serving as the first governor of East Darfur. He was the governor of the state from April until his resignation in December 2013, when East Darfur split from Southern Darfur. He is also the head of the Wise Men Commission of Darfur for Unity and Reconciliation. He belongs to the Rizeigat tribe, a Muslim and Arab tribe of the nomadic Bedouin Baggāra people in Sudan's Darfur region.

History
Before East Darfur was a state, Kasha was the governor of Southern Darfur (office April 2010). He defeated Alhaj Adam Yousef, the former vice president of Sudan, in the gubernatorial elections for Southern Darfur.

References

Sudanese politicians
East Darfur
National Congress Party (Sudan) politicians
Living people
Year of birth missing (living people)